Geumgok Station is a railway station of the Gyeongchun Line in Geumgok-dong, Namyangju-si, Gyeonggi-do, South Korea.

Station Layout

External links
 Station information from Korail

Metro stations in Namyangju
Seoul Metropolitan Subway stations
Railway stations opened in 1939